The 41st Intelligence Squadron is a United States Air Force unit.  Its current assignment is at Fort Meade, Maryland as of 26 Sep 2014.

The squadron is among some of the oldest in the United States Air Force, with its origins dating to the 41 Radio Squadron, Mobile. The squadron was activated on 1 Jun 1951. At some point, the squadron was redesignated 6913th RSM. The squadron was put on inactivated status on 8 May 1955. The squadron was reconstituted and redesignated as the 41 Intelligence Squadron on 3 Sep 2014 and was activated on 26 Sep 2014. The 512th Intelligence Squadron is an associated reserve unit.

History

 United States Air Force Security Service, 1 Jun 1951; 
 6960 Headquarters Support Group, 1 Sep 1951; 
 United States Air Force Security Service, 23 Jan 1952; 
 6910 Security Group, 25 Apr 1952 - 8 May 1955; 
 659 Intelligence, Surveillance, and Reconnaissance Group, 26 Sep 2014 - Present.

Lineage
 Organized as 41 Radio Squadron, Mobile on 11 Jun 1951
 Inactivated on 08 May 1955
 Redesignated 6913th RSM on an unknown date, possibly in Germany in 1951 and dismantled 17 years later in 1968
 Redesignated 41 Intelligence Squadron, on 03 Sep 2014
 Activated on 26 Sep 2014

Assignments

 Redacted as of 02 Feb 2023

Stations

Brooks AFB, Texas, 01 Jun - 13 Nov 1951
Bremen Enclave, Germany, 11 Dec 1951 - 08 May 1955
Fort Meade, Maryland, 26 Sep 2014 - Present

Aircraft
 Redacted as of 02 Feb 2023

References

Bibliography

External links
https://www.6913th.org/Bhaven/Photo1.htm

https://www.6913th.org/Bhaven/Photo1.htm#MISS

Military units and formations established in 2014
Military units and formations in Maryland